Ekow Zagla (1980 – 28 July 2019), also known as Bak Tye or Baka Tee, was a Ghanaian hiplife artist and rapper.

Career 
He was known for his hit track in 2004 known as Yenpie featuring Samini. In his prime he was featured by Mzbel in her song Awaso Me and Kofi Nti among many others.

Death 
He died from a chronic tuberculosis at the Ridge Hospital.

References 

1980 births
2019 deaths
Ghanaian highlife musicians
Musicians from Accra
21st-century deaths from tuberculosis
Infectious disease deaths in Ghana
Ghanaian rappers